Jamie Odom Pavilion, or simply Odom Pavilion, is a memorial pavilion along Lady Bird Lake in Austin, Texas, United States. The platform has been described as Austin's "most underused city-owned property".

References

Buildings and structures in Austin, Texas